The Love Experience is the debut studio album by American singer Raheem DeVaughn, released June 28, 2005 by Jive Records. The singles from this album were "Guess Who Loves You More", "Believe" and "You".

Netting sales of 250,000 according to Nielsen SoundScan, the album reached No. 9 on Top R&B/Hip-Hop Albums and No. 46 on the Billboard 200.

A Go-Go Version of the song "Sweet Tooth" was recorded by Rare Essence.

"You" is featured on Grand Theft Auto IV's fictional Soul/R&B radio station The Vibe 98.8.

The album cover was photographed by Daniel Hastings, who was known primarily for his work on seminal 1990's East Coast hip hop albums.

Track listing

Samples
 "The Love Experience" contains a sample of "My Friend in the Sky", as performed by Switch
 "Guess Who Loves You More" contains a sample of "Can't Hide Love", as performed by Earth, Wind & Fire
 "Ask Yourself" contains a sample of "Right on Time", as performed by Boyz II Men
 "Until" contains a sample of "Footsteps in the Dark", as performed by The Isley Brothers

References

Raheem DeVaughn albums
2005 debut albums